James Swanton Waugh (22 March 1822 – 6 November 1898) was a Wesleyan clergyman in Australia.

Waugh was born in Newtownbarry, Wexford, Ireland, and educated at the Royal School, Dungannon. Ordained in 1840, he volunteered to serve on the Victorian goldfields, arriving in Melbourne on 8 February 1854.

Waugh was president of Wesley College, Melbourne, until 1883. Minister Henry Howard was one of his students.

References
Renate Howe, "Waugh, James Swanton (1822 – 1898)", Australian Dictionary of Biography, volume 6, MUP, 1976, p. 366

Australian Methodist ministers
Australian people of Irish descent
People educated at the Royal School Dungannon
Wesleyan Methodists
1822 births
1898 deaths